Cape Irizar is a bold rocky headland that forms the northern end of Lamplugh Island, off the coast of Victoria Land, Antarctica. It was discovered by the British National Antarctic Expedition, 1901–04, under Robert Falcon Scott. He named it for Captain Julián Irízar, of the Argentine Navy's schooner Uruguay, who rescued the shipwrecked members of the Swedish Antarctic Expedition of 1901–04.

References

Headlands of Victoria Land
Scott Coast